Lukáš Vondráček (born 21 October 1986) is a Czech pianist. Noted by The Chicago Tribune for his "considerable tenderness of tone" and "expressive impact" and by The Washington Post for his "astonishing delicacy", Vondráček won the first prize in the Queen Elisabeth Competition in 2016, the first Czech musician to do so.

Early life and education 
Vondráček was born on 21 October 1986 in Opava, to professional pianist parents. He played his debut concert at the age of four, and gave his first international tour at ten years old. He studied at the Karol Szymanowski Academy of Music with Andrzej Jasiński, University of Music and Performing Arts Vienna with Peter Barcaba, University of Ostrava with Rudolf Bernatik, and at the New England Conservatory of Music with Hung-Kuan Chen, where he earned an Artist Diploma with Honors.

Career 
Vondráček has performed as soloist with the Chicago Symphony Orchestra, London Symphony Orchestra, BBC Philharmonic, Frankfurt Radio Symphony, Deutsches Symphonie-Orchester Berlin, Saint Petersburg Philharmonic Orchestra, Orchestre national de Lille, Warsaw National Philharmonic Orchestra, Prague Symphony Orchestra, NHK Symphony Orchestra, and Tokyo Metropolitan Symphony Orchestra, working with conductors such as Vladimir Ashkenazy, Paavo Järvi, Michael Tilson Thomas, Yannick Nézet-Séguin, Gianandrea Noseda, Christoph Eschenbach, Marin Alsop, Vasily Petrenko, and Jakub Hrůša.

In 2002, at the age of fifteen, Vondráček debuted with the Czech Philharmonic conducted by Vladimir Ashkenazy. Ashkenazy has said of Vondráček: "Such a pianist is born once in thirty years." This debut was followed by a major US tour in 2003. Reviewing a concert at Chicago's Symphony Center (the closing concert of the tour), Vondráček's performance of Prokofiev's Piano Concerto No. 1 was described by John von Rhein of the Chicago Tribune as "the hit of the evening".

In 2009, Vondráček was the recipient of The Raymond E. Buck Jury Discretionary Award at the 2009 Van Cliburn International Piano Competition. The following year, in 2010, he won the Hilton Head International Piano Competition.

In 2016, Vondráček won the Queen Elisabeth Competition, becoming the first Czech musician to do so. His performance in the final round, which included Claude Ledoux's A Butterfly's Dream and Sergei Rachmaninoff's Piano Concerto No. 3, led to a standing ovation.

Vondráček has continued to achieve considerable critical acclaim for his performances. Writing in The Boston Globe, Jeremy Eichler wrote about Vondráček's 2022 debut with the Boston Symphony Orchestra under Jakub Hrůša in Rachmaninoff's Piano Concerto No. 2: "his playing stood out most in its glittering, featherweight passagework and in its overall command of the work's dark, rhetorical drama." The same year, his return appearance with the Chicago Symphony Orchestra under Marin Alsop was hailed by WTTW as a "galvanic performance", adding: "Vondráček... rendered the extraordinary work with a superb mix of both titanic power and surprising lyricism."

Vondráček is currently recording all of the Rachmaninoff piano concertos with the Prague Symphony Orchestra. His discography includes releases for such labels as Two Pianists, Triton, and Musicom (where he recorded Rachmaninoff's Piano Concerto No. 1 with the Czech Philharmonic Orchestra conducted by Vladimir Ashkenazy).

References

1986 births
Living people
People from Opava
Prize-winners of the Queen Elisabeth Competition
Prize-winners of the Van Cliburn International Piano Competition
Czech classical pianists